Master Polikarp's Dialog with Death is a late medieval dialog in verse, written probably in the early 15th century. Master Polikarp's Dialog with Death is now regarded as one of the most important examples of medieval poetry in the Polish language. 

Its author is unknown, but after discovering the complete, printed version from 1542, some historians speculate that Mikołaj Rej rewrote the original text for print.

One of the unique features of the work is its use of humour. The dialog mocks monks and priests, inn-keepers, fat women, dishonest physicians and unjust judges. The work is patterned after the 12th century Latin poem  Dialogus mortis cum homine, and other such Latin-language publications popular in medieval Europe.

Versions 
The original version of the dialogue has been lost; what remains is an incomplete copy from  1463-1465, belonging to Mikołaj of Mirzyniec (Mikołaj z Mirzyńca). The ending of the work was known due to its 16th century Russian translation. It has 498 lines, and presents the everyday life of members of different social classes in 15th century Poland.

A formerly unknown printed edition of Rozmowa Mistrza Polikarpa ze Śmiercią (Master Polikarp’s Dialogue with Death) from 1542 (Cracow, Maciej Scharffenberg) has been discovered in one of the European university libraries. The discovery was made by Professor Wiesław Wydra from the Institute of Polish Philology at Adam Mickiewicz University in Poznań. In the contrast to the previously known version of the dialogue from the Płock manuscript, this text has been preserved in its entirety. 

This discovery, with a complete Polish text of 918 verses, was the most important event in Polish language and literature scholarship for several decades. The critical edition of the discovered text has been published by prof. Wiesław Wydra and became available on 7 November 2018.

Characters 
 Master Polikarp – a well-educated person 
 Death – pale, skinny, bald, yellowish, without nose and lips, showing its ribs, naked, a rotten kind of a woman; it holds a scythe in its hands, and its appearance reminds the reader that life is short, and that after death, human bodies decay

See also 
 Old Polish
 Danse Macabre
 Death (personification)
 Morana (goddess)
 Santa Muerte

References

Citations

Sources
 Polska poezja świecka XV wieku, oprac. M. Włodarski, Wrocław - Warszawa - Kraków 1997, BN I, 60.
 "Śmierci z Mistrzem dwojakie gadania…". Nieznany drukowany przekaz "Rozmowy mistrza Polikarpa ze Śmiercią" z 1542 r., wydał Wiesław Wydra, Poznań 2018.

External links 
 English translation of the beginning of the manuscript (fragment) at staropolska.pl

Biblical exegesis
Biblical poetry
Christian art about death
Dialogues
History of Poland
Medieval Polish literature
15th-century poems